The Interdiction Assault Ship (IAS) was an aircraft cruiser conversion project in 1980 for the Iowa-class battleships that would have removed the aft main gun turret. This would free up space for a V-shaped ramped flight deck (the base of the V would have been on the ship's stern, while each leg of the V would extend forward, so that planes taking off would fly past the ship's exhaust stacks and conning tower), while a new hangar would be added with two elevators, which would support up to twelve McDonnell Douglas AV-8B Harrier II jump-jets. These aviation facilities could also support helicopters, SEAL teams and up to 500 Marines for an air assault. In the empty space between the V flight deck would be up to 320 missile silos accommodating a mixture of Tomahawk land attack missiles, ASROC anti-submarine rockets and Standard surface-to-air missiles. The existing five-inch gun turrets would be replaced with 155-millimeter howitzers for naval gunfire support. These modifications would have required significant time and funding to achieve so it was never carried out, furthermore the Department of Defense and the Navy wanted the Iowa battleships reactivated as quickly as possible.

See also
 Fighter catapult ship
 Merchant aircraft carrier
 Seaplane tender

References

Sources 
 

Aircraft cruiser classes
Cruisers
Ship types
Abandoned military projects of the United States